Natalya Diehm (born 23 September 1997) is an Australian cyclist who competes in Freestyle BMX.

Diehm was born in Gladstone, Queensland and grew up in nearby Boyne Island. 

Diehm finished 6th at the 2019 UCI Urban Cycling World Championships at Australia’s first appearance in the event. In 2019 she won the inaugural Oceania Championships as well as winning the Australian national title. In total she has three national titles.

After recovering from her fourth knee reconstruction in late 2018, Diehm was discouraged from pursuing her Olympic ambitions and almost left the sport. However, she received motivation from BMX racing world champion and Olympian Caroline Buchanan who contacted Diehm to offer encouragement and support which prompted Diehm to continue.

Diehm made history as one of Australia’s first Olympic BMX freestylers when the discipline made its Games debut at the 2020 Tokyo Olympic Games.  As the only two Australian BMX freestylers selected, Diehm became the first Australian woman to compete in the women's event while Logan Martin will become the first Australian man to compete in the men's event. Diehm reached the women’s freestyle final, but finished fifth.

References 

Living people
1997 births
BMX riders
Australian female cyclists
Sportswomen from Queensland
Cyclists at the 2020 Summer Olympics
Olympic cyclists of Australia
20th-century Australian women
21st-century Australian women